Remain in Light is the fourth studio album by American rock band Talking Heads, released on October 8, 1980 by Sire Records. It was recorded at Compass Point Studios in the Bahamas and Sigma Sound Studios in Philadelphia during July and August 1980. It was the last Talking Heads album to be produced by Brian Eno.

After the release of Fear of Music in 1979, Talking Heads and Eno sought to dispel notions of the band as a mere vehicle for frontman and songwriter David Byrne. Drawing influence from Nigerian musician Fela Kuti, they experimented with African polyrhythms, funk, and electronics, recording instrumental tracks as a series of looping grooves. The sessions incorporated a variety of side musicians, including guitarist Adrian Belew, singer Nona Hendryx, and trumpet player Jon Hassell.

Byrne struggled with writer's block, but adopted a scattered, stream-of-consciousness lyrical style inspired by early rap and academic literature on Africa. The artwork was conceived by bassist Tina Weymouth and drummer Chris Frantz, and crafted with the help of the Massachusetts Institute of Technology's computers and design company M&Co. The band hired additional members for a promotional tour, and following its completion, they went on a year-long hiatus to pursue side projects.

Remain in Light was acclaimed by critics, who praised its sonic experimentation, rhythmic innovations, and cohesive merging of disparate genres. The album peaked at number 19 on the US Billboard 200 and number 21 on the UK Albums Chart, and spawned the singles "Once in a Lifetime" and "Houses in Motion". It has been featured in several publications' lists of the best albums of the 1980s and of all time, and is often considered Talking Heads' magnum opus. In 2017, the Library of Congress deemed the album "culturally, historically, or artistically significant", and selected it for preservation in the National Recording Registry.

Background
In January 1980, the members of Talking Heads returned to New York City after the tours in support of their 1979 critically acclaimed third album, Fear of Music, and took time off to pursue personal interests. Singer David Byrne worked with Brian Eno, the record's producer, on an experimental album, My Life in the Bush of Ghosts. Keyboardist Jerry Harrison produced an album for soul singer Nona Hendryx at the Sigma Sound Studios branch in New York City; Hendryx and the studio were used during the Remain in Light recording on Harrison's advice.

Drummer Chris Frantz and bassist Tina Weymouth, a married couple, discussed leaving Talking Heads after Weymouth suggested that Byrne was too controlling. Frantz did not want to leave, and the two took a long vacation in the Caribbean to ponder the state of the band and their marriage. They became involved in Haitian Vodou religious ceremonies, practised native percussion instruments, and socialised with the reggae rhythm section of Sly and Robbie.

Frantz and Weymouth ended their holiday by purchasing an apartment above Compass Point Studios in Nassau, the Bahamas, where Talking Heads had recorded its second album, More Songs About Buildings and Food. Byrne joined the duo and Harrison there in early 1980. The band members realized that it had been solely up to Byrne to craft songs even though they were performed as a quartet. They had tired of the notion of a singer leading a backup band; the ideal they aimed for, according to Byrne, was "sacrificing our egos for mutual cooperation". Byrne also wanted to escape "the psychological paranoia and personal torment" he had been writing and feeling in New York. Instead of writing music to Byrne's lyrics, Talking Heads performed instrumental jams, using the Fear of Music song "I Zimbra" as a starting point.

Eno arrived in the Bahamas three weeks after Byrne. He was reluctant to work with the band again after collaborating on the previous two albums. He changed his mind after being excited by the instrumental demo tapes. The band and Eno experimented with the communal African way of making music, in which individual parts mesh as polyrhythms. Afrodisiac, the 1973 Afrobeat record by Nigerian musician Fela Kuti, became the template for the album. Weymouth said that the beginnings of hip-hop music made Talking Heads realize that the musical landscape was changing. Before the studio sessions began, the band's friend David Gans told them that "the things one doesn't intend are the seeds for a more interesting future". He encouraged them to experiment, improvise and make use of "mistakes".

Recording and production

Recording sessions started at Compass Point Studios in July 1980. The album's creation required additional musicians, particularly percussionists. Talking Heads used the working title Melody Attack throughout the studio process after watching a Japanese game show of the same name. Harrison said the ambition was to blend rock and African genres, rather than simply imitate African music. Eno's production techniques and personal approach were key to the record's conception. The process was geared to promote the expression of instinct and spontaneity without overtly focusing on the sound of the final product. Eno compared the creative process to "looking out to the world and saying, 'What a fantastic place we live in. Let's celebrate it.'"

Sections and instrumentals were recorded one at a time in a discontinuous process. Loops played a key part at a time when computers could not yet adequately perform such functions. Talking Heads developed Remain in Light by recording jams, isolating the best parts, and learning to play them repetitively. The basic tracks focused wholly on rhythms and were all performed in a minimalist method using only one chord. Each section was recorded as a long loop to enable the creation of compositions through the positioning or merging of loops in different ways. Byrne likened the process to modern sampling: "We were human samplers."

After a few sessions in the Bahamas, engineer Rhett Davies left following an argument with the producer over the fast speed of recording. Steven Stanley, who since age 17 had engineered for musicians such as Bob Marley, stepped in to cover the workload. Frantz credited him with helping create "Once in a Lifetime", which was released as a single. A Lexicon 224 digital reverb effects unit, obtained by engineer and mixer Dave Jerden, was used on the album. The machine was one of the first of its kind and able to simulate environments such as echo chambers and rooms through interchangeable programs. Like Davies, Jerden was unhappy with the fast pace at which Eno wanted to record sonically complicated compositions, but did not complain.

The tracks made Byrne rethink his vocal style and he tried singing to the instrumental songs, but sounded "stilted". Few vocal sections were recorded in the Bahamas. The lyrics were written when the band returned to the U.S., in New York City and California. Harrison booked Talking Heads into Sigma Sound, which focused primarily on R&B music, after convincing the owners that the band's work could bring them a new type of clientele. In New York City, Byrne struggled with writer's block. Harrison and Eno spent their time tweaking the compositions recorded in the Bahamas, while Frantz and Weymouth often did not show up at the studio. Doubts began to surface about whether the album would be completed. The recording sessions sped up only after the recruitment of guitarist Adrian Belew at the request of Byrne, Harrison and Eno. He was advised to add guitar solos to the Compass Point tracks, making use of a Roland guitar synthesiser. Belew recalled: "All of my parts were done in one day".

Byrne recorded all the tracks, as they were after Belew had performed on them, to a cassette and looked to Africa to break his writer's block. He realized that, when African musicians forget words, they often make up new ones. He used a portable tape recorder and tried to create onomatopoeic rhymes in the style of Eno, who believed that lyrics were never the center of a song's meaning. Byrne continuously listened to his recorded scatting until convinced that he was no longer "hearing nonsense". After he was satisfied, Harrison invited Nona Hendryx to Sigma Sound to record backing vocals for the album. She was advised extensively on her vocal delivery by Byrne, Frantz, and Weymouth, and often sang in a trio with Byrne and Eno. The voice sessions were followed by the overdubbing process. Brass player Jon Hassell, who had worked on parts of My Life in the Bush of Ghosts, was hired to perform trumpet and horn sections. In August 1980, half of the album was mixed by Eno and engineer John Potoker in New York City with the assistance of Harrison, while the other half was mixed by Byrne and Jerden at Eldorado Studios in Los Angeles.

Music and lyrics

Remain in Light features new wave, post-punk, worldbeat, dance-rock, art pop, art rock, avant-pop, and different types of funk, specifically afrofunk and psychedelic funk. Critic Stephen Thomas Erlewine called the album a "dense amalgam of African percussion, funk bass and keyboards, pop songs, and electronics." It contains eight songs with a "striking free-associative feel", according to psychoanalyst Michael A. Brog, in that there is no long-lasting coherent thought process that can be followed in the stream-of-consciousness lyrics. David Gans instructed Byrne to be freer with his lyrical content, advising him that "rational thinking has its limits". Byrne included a bibliography with the album press kit along with a statement that explained how the album was inspired by African mythologies and rhythms. The release stressed that the major inspiration for the lyrics was John Miller Chernoff's African Rhythm and African Sensibility, which examined the musical enhancement of life in the continent's rural communities. Chernoff travelled to Ghana in 1970 to study native percussion and wrote about how Africans have complicated conversations through drum patterns. One of the songs, "The Great Curve", exemplifies the African theme by including the line "The world moves on a woman's hips", which Byrne used after reading Robert Farris Thompson's book African Art in Motion. He also studied straight speech, from John Dean's Watergate testimony to the stories of African American former slaves.

Like the other tracks, album opener "Born Under Punches (The Heat Goes On)" borrows from "preaching, shouting and ranting". The expression "And the Heat Goes On", used in the title and repeated in the chorus, is based on a New York Post headline Eno read in the summer of 1980, while Byrne rewrote the song title "Don't Worry About the Government" from Talking Heads' debut album, Talking Heads: 77, into the lyric "Look at the hands of a government man". The "rhythmical rant" in "Crosseyed and Painless"—"Facts are simple and facts are straight. Facts are lazy and facts are late"—is influenced by old school rap, specifically Kurtis Blow's "The Breaks", given to Byrne by Frantz. "Once in a Lifetime" borrows heavily from preachers' diatribes. Some critics have suggested that the song is "a kind of prescient jab at the excesses of the 1980s". Byrne disagreed with the categorisation and commented that its lyrics are meant to be taken literally; he said, "We're largely unconscious. You know, we operate half awake or on autopilot and end up, whatever, with a house and family and job and everything else, and we haven't really stopped to ask ourselves, 'How did I get here?'."

Byrne has described the album's final mix as a "spiritual" piece of work, "joyous and ecstatic and yet it's serious"; he has pointed out that, in the end, there was "less Africanism in Remain in Light than we implied ... but the African ideas were far more important to get across than specific rhythms". According to Eno, the record uniquely blends funk and punk rock or new wave music. None of the compositions include chord changes, relying instead on the use of different harmonics and notes. "Spidery riffs" and layered tracks of bass and percussion are used extensively. The first side contains the more rhythmic songs, "Born Under Punches (The Heat Goes On)", "Crosseyed and Painless", and "The Great Curve", which include long instrumental interludes. "The Great Curve" contains extended synthesizer-treated guitar solos by Belew.

The second side features more introspective songs. "Once in a Lifetime" pays homage to early rap techniques and the music of the Velvet Underground. The track was originally called "Weird Guitar Riff Song" because of its composition. It was conceived as a single riff before the band added a second, boosted riff on top of the first. Eno alternated eight bars of each riff with corresponding bars of its counterpart. "Houses in Motion" incorporates long brass performances by Hassell, while "Listening Wind" features Arabic music elements. The final track on the album, "The Overload", features "tribal-cum-industrial" beats created primarily by Harrison and Byrne.

Packaging and title

Weymouth and Frantz conceived the cover art with the help of Massachusetts Institute of Technology researcher Walter Bender and his ArcMac team (the precursor to the MIT Media Lab). Using Melody Attack as inspiration, the couple created a collage of red warplanes flying in formation over the Himalayas. The planes are an artistic depiction of Grumman Avenger planes in honor of Weymouth's father, Ralph Weymouth, who was a US Navy Admiral. The idea for the back cover included simple portraits of the band members. Weymouth attended MIT regularly during the summer of 1980 and worked with Bender's colleague, Scott Fisher, on the computer renditions of the ideas. The process was tortuous because computer power was limited in the early 1980s and the mainframe alone took up several rooms. Weymouth and Fisher shared a passion for masks and used the concept to experiment with the portraits. The faces (except for eyes, noses and mouths) were blotted out with blocks of red colour. Weymouth considered superimposing Eno's face on top of all four portraits to insinuate his egotism—Eno wanted to be on the cover art—but decided against it.

The rest of the artwork and the liner notes were crafted by the graphic designer Tibor Kalman and his company M&Co. Kalman was a fervent critic of formalism and professional design in art and advertisements. He offered his services for free to create publicity, and discussed using unconventional materials such as sandpaper and velour for the LP sleeve. Weymouth, who was skeptical of hiring a designing firm, vetoed Kalman's ideas and held firm on the MIT computerized images. The designing process made the band members realize that the title Melody Attack was "too flippant" for the music, and they adopted Remain in Light instead. Byrne has said, "Besides not being all that melodic, the music had something to say that at the time seemed new, transcendent, and maybe even revolutionary, at least for funk rock songs." The image of the warplanes was relegated to the back of the sleeve and the doctored portraits became the front cover. Kalman later suggested that the planes were not removed altogether because they seemed appropriate during the Iranian hostage crisis of 1979–81.

Weymouth advised Kalman that she wanted simple typography in a bold sans serif font. M&Co. complied, with Kalman coming up with the idea of inverting the "A"s in "TALKING HEADS". Weymouth and Frantz decided to use the joint credit acronym C/T for the artwork, while Bender and Fisher used initials and code names because the project was not an official MIT venture. The design credits read "HCL, JPT, DDD, WALTER GP, PAUL, C/T". The final mass-produced version of Remain in Light had one of the first computer-designed record jackets. Psychoanalyst Michael A. Brog has called its front cover a "disarming image, which suggests both splitting and obliteration of identity", and which introduces the listener to the album's recurring theme of "identity disturbance"; he has said, "The image is in bleak contrast to the title with the obscured images of the band members unable to 'remain in light'."

Talking Heads and Eno originally agreed to credit all songs in alphabetical order to "David Byrne, Brian Eno, Chris Frantz, Jerry Harrison and Tina Weymouth" after failing to devise an accurate formula for the split, but the album was released with the label credit: "all songs written by David Byrne & Brian Eno (except "Houses In Motion" and 'The Overload", written by David Byrne, Brian Eno & Jerry Harrison)". Frantz, Harrison, and Weymouth disputed the credits, especially for a process they had partly funded. According to Weymouth, Byrne told Kalman to doctor the credits on Eno's advice. Later editions credit all band members. Frantz said, "we felt very burned by the credits dispute".

Promotion and release

Brian Eno advised Talking Heads that the music on Remain in Light was too dense for a quartet to perform. The band expanded to nine musicians for the tours in support of the album. The augmenting members recruited by Harrison were Belew, Funkadelic keyboardist Bernie Worrell, bassist Busta "Cherry" Jones, Ashford & Simpson percussionist Steven Scales, and backing vocalist Dolette MacDonald. The larger group performed soundchecks in Frantz's and Weymouth's loft by following the rhythms established by Worrell, who had studied at the New England Conservatory and Juilliard School.

The expanded band's first appearance was on August 23, 1980, at the Heatwave festival in Canada in front of 70,000 people; Robert Hilburn of the Los Angeles Times called the band's new music a "rock-funk sound with dramatic, near show-stopping force". On August 27, the expanded Talking Heads performed a showcase of tracks to an 8,000-person full house audience at the Wollman Rink as well as approximately another 10,000 seated on the grass outside the walls in New York City's Central Park. The Canada and New York gigs were the only ones initially planned, but Sire Records decided to support the nine-member band on an extended tour. After the promotional tour, the band went on hiatus for several years, leaving the individual members to pursue a variety of side projects.

Remain in Light was released worldwide on October 8, 1980, and received its world premiere, airing in its entirety, on October 10 on WDFM. According to writer David Sheppard, "it was received as a great cultural event as much as a vivid art-pop record." Unusually, the album's press release included a bibliography submitted by Byrne and Eno citing books by Chernoff and others to provide context for how the songs were conceived. While the publicity shaped the album's critical reputation, not everybody was on board. “I didn't read those books,” said an incensed Weymouth.

Remain in Light was certified Gold by the Canadian Recording Industry Association in February 1981 after shipping 50,000 copies, and by Recording Industry Association of America in September 1985 after shipping 500,000. Over one million copies have been sold worldwide.

Critical reception

The album attained widespread acclaim from media outlets. Ken Tucker of Rolling Stone felt it was a brave and absorbing attempt to locate a common ground in the early 1980s' divergent and often hostile musical genres; he concluded, "Remain in Light yields scary, funny music to which you can dance and think, think and dance, dance and think, ad infinitum." Robert Christgau, in The Village Voice, called the record one "in which David Byrne conquers his fear of music in a visionary Afrofunk synthesis—clear-eyed, detached, almost mystically optimistic". Michael Kulp of the Daily Collegian wrote that the album deserved the tag "classic" like each of the band's three previous full-length releases, while John Rockwell, writing in The New York Times, suggested that it confirmed Talking Heads' position as "America's most venturesome rock band". Sandy Robertson of Sounds praised the record's innovation, while Billboard wrote, "Just about every LP Talking Heads has released in the last four years has wound up on virtually every critics' best of list. Remain in Light should be no exception."

AllMusic's William Ruhlmann wrote that Talking Heads' musical transition, first witnessed in Fear of Music, came to full fruition in Remain in Light: "Talking Heads were connecting with an audience ready to follow their musical evolution, and the album was so inventive and influential." In the 1995 Spin Alternative Record Guide, Jeff Salamon praised Eno for reining in any excessive appropriations of African music. In 2004, Slant Magazines Barry Walsh labeled its results "simply magical" after the band turned rock music into a more global entity in terms of its musical and lyrical scope. In a 2008 review, Sean Fennessey of Vibe concluded, "Talking Heads took African polyrhythms to NYC and made a return trip with elegant, alien post-punk in tow."

Accolades and legacy
Remain in Light was named the best album of 1980 by Sounds, ahead of the Skids' The Absolute Game, and by Melody Maker, while The New York Times included it in its unnumbered shortlist of the 10 best records issued that year. It figured highly in other end-of-year best album lists, notably at number two, behind The Clash's London Calling, by Christgau, and at number six by NME. It featured at number three—behind London Calling and Bruce Springsteen's The River—in The Village Voices 1980 Pazz & Jop critics' poll, which aggregates the votes of hundreds of prominent reviewers.

In 1989, Rolling Stone named Remain in Light the fourth-best album of the 1980s. In 1993, it was included at number 11 in NMEs list of The 50 Greatest Albums Of The '80s, and at number 68 in the publication's Greatest Albums Of All Time list. In 1997, The Guardian collated worldwide data from renowned critics, artists, and radio DJs, which placed the record at number 43 in the list of the 100 Best Albums Ever. In 1999, it was included by Vibe as one of its 100 Essential Albums Of The 20th Century. In 2000 it was voted number 227 in Colin Larkin's All Time Top 1000 Albums. In 2002, Pitchfork featured Remain in Light at number two behind Sonic Youth's Daydream Nation in its Top 100 Albums Of The 1980s list. In 2003, VH1 named the record at number 88 during its 100 Greatest Albums countdown, while Slant Magazine included it in its unnumbered shortlist of 50 Essential Pop Albums. Rolling Stone placed it at number 129 in its December 2015 issue of "The 500 Greatest Albums of All Time", higher than three other Talking Heads releases.  In 2020 Rolling Stone ranked it number 39 on its updated list of the "500 Greatest Albums of All Time". In 2006, Q ranked Remain in Light at number 27 in its list of the 40 Best Albums of the 80s. In 2012, Slant listed the album sixth on its list of the "Best Albums of the 1980s". In 2020, Rolling Stone included Remain in Light in its "80 Greatest albums of 1980" list, praising the band for fusing "new Wave, world beat, funk, and more, which resulted in the most danceable record of their career."

The English band Radiohead credited Remain in Light as a major influence on their 2000 album Kid A. The guitarist Jonny Greenwood had assumed Remain in Light was composed of loops, but later learnt from Harrison that Talking Heads had played the parts repetitively. Greenwood said: "It's played the same exact thing for five minutes, which is really interesting. And that's why it's not exhausting to listen to because you're not hearing the same piece of music over and over again. You're hearing it slightly different every time. There's a lesson there."

In 2018, the Beninese singer Angélique Kidjo released a song-for-song cover of Remain in Light (produced by Jeff Bhasker and released on his Kravenworks label). She described herself as a longtime fan of the song "Once in a Lifetime" and wanting to pay tribute to the album by emphasizing its inspiration from African music.

In 2022, Harrison and Belew united for three concert dates in honor of the album's 40th anniversary, where they played all of Remain in Light plus several more Talking Heads songs. In 2023 they expanded the project to a full North American tour.

Track listing

Personnel 
Those involved in the making of Remain in Light were:

Talking Heads
 David Byrne – lead vocals, keyboards, guitars, bass, percussion, vocal arrangements
 Jerry Harrison – keyboards, guitars, percussion, backing vocals
 Tina Weymouth – keyboards, bass, percussion, backing vocals
 Chris Frantz – keyboards, drums, percussion, backing vocals

Additional musicians
 Brian Eno – keyboards, guitars, bass, percussion, backing vocals, vocal arrangements
 Adrian Belew – guitars, Roland guitar synthesizer
 Robert Palmer – percussion
 José Rossy – percussion
 Jon Hassell – trumpets, horns
 Nona Hendryx – backing vocals

Production 
 Brian Eno – producer, mixing
 Dave Jerden – engineer, mixing
 David Byrne – mixing
 John Potoker – additional engineer, mixing
 Rhett Davies – additional engineer
 Jack Nuber – additional engineer
 Steven Stanley – additional engineer
 Kendall Stubbs – additional engineer
 Greg Calbi – mastering at Sterling Sound (New York City, New York)
 Tina Weymouth – cover art
 Chris Frantz – cover art
 Walter Bender – cover art assistant
 Scott Fisher – cover art assistant
 Tibor Kalman – artwork
 Carol Bokuniewics – artwork
 MIT Architecture Machine Group – computer rendering

Charts

Certifications and sales

See also
 Everything That Happens Will Happen Today
 Live Phish Volume 15
 Remain in Light, Angélique Kidjo's track-by-track reimagination of the album

References

Bibliography

Further reading

External links

Remain in Light (Adobe Flash) at Radio3Net (streamed copy where licensed)
Remain in Light 2023 Tour with Jerry Harrison and Adrian Belew

1980 albums
Talking Heads albums
Albums produced by Brian Eno
Sire Records albums
Worldbeat albums
United States National Recording Registry recordings
United States National Recording Registry albums